Sir Charles Algernon Parsons,  (13 June 1854 – 11 February 1931) was an Anglo-Irish engineer, best known for his invention of the compound steam turbine, and as the eponym of C. A. Parsons and Company. He worked as an engineer on dynamo and turbine design, and power generation, with great influence on the naval and electrical engineering fields. He also developed optical equipment for searchlights and telescopes.

Career and commercial activity 

Parsons was born into an Anglo-Irish family in London as the youngest son of the famous astronomer William Parsons, 3rd Earl of Rosse. (The family seat is Birr Castle, County Offaly, Ireland, and the town of Birr was called Parsonstown, after the family, from 1620 to 1901.)

With his three brothers, Parsons was educated at home in Ireland by private tutors (including John Purser), all of whom were well versed in the sciences and also acted as practical assistants to the Earl in his astronomical work. (One of them later became, as Sir Robert Ball, Astronomer Royal for Ireland.) Parsons then read mathematics at Trinity College, Dublin and at St. John's College, Cambridge, graduating from the latter in 1877 with a first-class honours degree. He joined the Newcastle-based engineering firm of W.G. Armstrong as an apprentice, an unusual step for the son of an earl. Later he moved to Kitsons in Leeds, where he worked on rocket-powered torpedoes.

Steam turbine engine 

In 1884 Parsons moved to Clarke, Chapman and Co., ship-engine manufacturers operating near Newcastle, where he became head of their electrical-equipment development. He developed a turbine engine there in 1884 and immediately utilised the new engine to drive an electrical generator, which he also designed. Parsons' steam turbine made cheap and plentiful electricity possible and revolutionised marine transport and naval warfare.

Another type of steam turbine at the time, invented by Gustaf de Laval (1845–1913) in the 1880s, was an impulse design that subjected the mechanism to huge centrifugal forces and so had limited output due to the weakness of the materials available. Parsons explained in his 1911 Rede Lecture that his appreciation of the scaling issue led to his 1884 breakthrough on the compound steam-turbine:

<blockquote>It seemed to me that moderate surface velocities and speeds of rotation were essential if the turbine motor was to receive general acceptance as a prime mover. I therefore decided to split up the fall in pressure of the steam into small fractional expansions over a large number of turbines in series, so that the velocity of the steam nowhere should be great...I was also anxious to avoid the well-known cutting action on metal of steam at high velocity.</blockquote>

 Founding Parsons and Company 

In 1889 he founded C. A. Parsons and Company in Newcastle to produce turbo generators to his design. In the same year he set up the Newcastle and District Electric Lighting Company (DisCO). In 1890, DisCo opened Forth Banks Power Station, the first power-station in the world to generate electricity using turbo generators.
In 1894 he regained certain patent rights from Clarke Chapman. Although his first turbine was only 1.6% efficient and generated a mere 7.5 kilowatts, rapid incremental improvements in a few years led to his first megawatt turbine, built in 1899 for a generating plant at Elberfeld in the German Empire.

 Marine steam turbine applications 

Also interested in marine applications, Parsons founded the Parsons Marine Steam Turbine Company in Newcastle. Famously, in June 1897, his turbine-powered yacht, Turbinia, turned up unannounced at the Navy Review for the Diamond Jubilee of Queen Victoria at Spithead, on 26 June 1897, in front of the Prince of Wales, foreign dignitaries, and Lords of the Admiralty. Moving at speed at Queen Victoria's Diamond Jubilee Fleet Review off Portsmouth, to demonstrate the great potential of the new technology. Part of the speed improvement came from the slender hull of the Turbinia.

( Turbinia is housed in a purpose-built gallery at the Discovery Museum, Newcastle.)

 Honours and awards 

Parsons was elected a Fellow of the Royal Society in June 1898, received their Rumford Medal in 1902 and their Copley Medal in 1928, and delivered their Bakerian Lecture in 1918. He served as the president of the British Association from 1916 to 1919. He was an Invited Speaker of the ICM in 1924 at Toronto. Knighted in 1911, he became  a member of the Order of Merit in 1927. In 1929 the Iron and Steel Institute awarded him the Bessemer Gold Medal.

 Surviving companies 

The Parsons turbine company survives in the Heaton area of Newcastle as part of Siemens, a German conglomerate. In 1925 Charles Parsons acquired the Grubb Telescope Company and renamed it Grubb Parsons. That company survived in the Newcastle area until 1985.

Parsons also designed the Auxetophone, an early compressed-air gramophone.

 Personal life and death 

In 1883, Parsons married Katharine Bethell, the daughter of William F. Bethell. They had two children: the engineer and campaigner Rachel Mary Parsons (b. 1885), and Algernon George "Tommy" Parsons (b. 1886), who was killed in action during World War I in 1918, aged 31.

They had a London home at 1 Upper Brook Street, Mayfair, from 1918 to 1931.

Sir Charles Algernon Parsons died on 11 February 1931, on board the steamship Duchess of Richmond'' while on a cruise with his wife. The cause of death was given as neuritis. A memorial service was held at Westminster Abbey on 3 March 1931. Parsons was buried in the parish church of St Bartholomew's in Kirkwhelpington in Northumberland.

His widow, Katharine, died at her home in Ray Demesne, Kirkwhelpington, Northumberland in 1933. Rachel Parsons died in 1956; stableman Denis James Pratt was convicted of her manslaughter.

In 1919, Katharine and her daughter Rachel co-founded the Women's Engineering Society with Eleanor Shelley-Rolls, Margaret, Lady Moir, Laura Annie Willson, Margaret Rowbotham and Janetta Mary Ornsby, which is still in existence today. Sir Charles was initially a supportive member of the organisation until his wife's resignation.

Commemoration

Parsons' ancestral home at Birr Castle in Ireland houses a museum detailing the contribution the Parsons family have made to the fields of science and engineering, with part of the museum given over to the engineering work of Charles Parsons.

Parsons is depicted on the reverse of an Irish silver 15 Euros silver Proof coin that was struck in 2017.

The Irish Academy of Engineering awards The Parsons Medal, named after Charles Parsons, every year to an engineer that has made an exceptional contribution to the practice of engineering. Previous winners include Prof. Tony Fagan (2016), Dr. Edmond Harty (2017), Prof. Sir John McCanny (2018) and Michael McLaughlin (2019).

Selected works 

 E-book: "The Steam Turbine and Other Inventions of Sir Charles Parsons"
 The Steam Turbine (Rede Lecture, 1911)
 Charles Parsons' grand-nephew, Michael Parsons in his 1968 Trinity Monday Discourse.

References

Further reading

External links 

 
 Sir Charles Parsons Symposium, excerpts from Transactions of the  Newcomen Society
 
 

1854 births
1931 deaths
19th-century Anglo-Irish people
20th-century Anglo-Irish people
Alumni of St John's College, Cambridge
Alumni of Trinity College Dublin
Bessemer Gold Medal
English engineers
English knights
English inventors
British steam engine engineers
British inventors
Corresponding Members of the USSR Academy of Sciences
Fellows of the Royal Society
Irish engineers
Irish knights
Irish inventors
Knights Commander of the Order of the Bath
Marine engine manufacturers
Members of the Order of Merit
Foreign associates of the National Academy of Sciences
People associated with electricity
People from County Offaly
Engineers from Tyne and Wear
Presidents of the British Science Association
Presidents of the Institute of Physics
Recipients of the Copley Medal
Steam turbines
Turbines
Younger sons of earls
Women's Engineering Society